Joseph Frank Pesci (born February 9, 1943) is an American actor and musician. He is known for portraying tough, volatile characters in a variety of genres and for his collaborations with Robert De Niro and Martin Scorsese in the films Raging Bull (1980), Goodfellas (1990), Casino (1995), and The Irishman (2019). He also appeared in Once Upon a Time in America (1984), Moonwalker (1988), JFK (1991), A Bronx Tale (1993), and The Good Shepherd (2006). His comedy roles include such films as the first two installments in the Home Alone franchise (1990–1992), My Cousin Vinny (1992), and the Lethal Weapon franchise (1989–1998).

Pesci won the Academy Award for Best Supporting Actor for his role as the gangster character Tommy DeVito in Goodfellas and received two other nominations in the same category for his portrayals of Joey LaMotta and Russell Bufalino in Raging Bull and The Irishman, respectively. He announced his retirement from acting in 1999, but has returned to act in 4 films since then.

He is also a musician who has recorded three studio albums, Little Joe Sure Can Sing! (1968), Vincent LaGuardia Gambini Sings Just for You (1998), and Pesci... Still Singing (2019).

Early life
Pesci was born on February 9, 1943, in Newark, New Jersey. His mother, Maria (Mesce) worked part time as a barber, and his father, Angelo Pesci was a forklift, truck driver for General Motors and a bartender. He is of Italian descent with family origins both in Turin and Aquilonia in the province of Avellino. Pesci was raised in Belleville, New Jersey, and graduated from Belleville High School. By the time Pesci was five years old he was appearing in plays in New York. At age 10 he was a regular on a television variety show called Startime Kids, which also featured Connie Francis.

As a teenager, Pesci was friends with singers Frankie Valli (who is nine years his senior) and Tommy DeVito (who was 15 years his senior). In 1959 at age 16, he helped introduce them to singer and songwriter Bob Gaudio, which led to the formation of the band The Four Seasons. Pesci also grew up around numerous wiseguys.

Career

Early career
In the 1960s, Pesci began working as a barber, following in his mother's footsteps. At the same time, he tried to start a musical career, playing guitar with several bands, including Joey Dee and the Starliters who introduced the "Peppermint Twist" record, dance, and Peppermint Lounge in New York City.

In 1968, he released his debut album Little Joe Sure Can Sing! (billed as Joe Ritchie), on which he sang covers of contemporary pop hits.

Pesci later joined Frank Vincent as a comedy duo, performing as "Vincent and Pesci" from 1970 to 1976. Their act coupled Abbott and Costello-inspired double act antics with Don Rickles-style insult comedy, which proved popular with crowds. During this time, both men developed a strong professional and personal friendship with one another. In 1975, they appeared in the Broadway show The New Vaudevillians, which only lasted one week.

The first film Pesci starred in was the 1976 low-budget crime film The Death Collector alongside Frank Vincent. After the film Pesci returned to The Bronx and lived above Amici's Restaurant, where he was an employee.

Acting career

In 1979, Pesci received a telephone call from Martin Scorsese and Robert De Niro, who were impressed with his performance in The Death Collector and asked him to co-star in Scorsese's Raging Bull as Joey LaMotta. During the course of filming Pesci broke one of his ribs.

Pesci won the BAFTA Film Award for Newcomer to Leading Film Roles in 1981 and was nominated for an Academy Award for Best Supporting Actor. Over the next few years, Pesci appeared in several smaller films, including Dear Mr. Wonderful (1982), Eureka (1983) and Easy Money (1983).

In 1984, he was cast in Once Upon a Time in America, again appearing alongside De Niro. The following year he starred as private detective Rocky Nelson in the short-lived television comedy series Half Nelson.

In 1988, Pesci appeared in the Michael Jackson musical anthology film Moonwalker, in the film's sixth and longest segment, "Smooth Criminal." He played the antagonist, crime boss Frankie "Mr. Big" LiDeo (an anagram for one of the film's producers and longtime Jackson manager Frank DiLeo, with whom Pesci later acted in Goodfellas).

He appeared as Leo Getz, a comedic sidekick and best friend to protagonist detectives Martin Riggs (Mel Gibson) and Roger Murtaugh (Danny Glover) in the Lethal Weapon sequels, released in 1989, 1992 and 1998.

In 1990, he reunited with Scorsese and De Niro for Goodfellas, in which he played mobster Tommy DeVito, based on real-life mobster Thomas DeSimone (Tommy DeVito also being the name of Pesci's old acquaintance from Belleville, New Jersey, and a member of The Four Seasons, but contrary to popular belief, the naming is coincidental). Pesci's old friend Frank Vincent also appears in the film. Pesci's character kills Vincent's character in a rage in one of the best-remembered scenes in the film after the Vincent character contemptuously tells him to "go home and get your fucking shine box." According to Pesci, improvisation and ad-libbing came out of rehearsals wherein Scorsese let the actors do whatever they wanted. He made transcripts of these sessions, took the lines the actors came up with that he liked best, and put them into a revised script that the cast worked from during principal photography. 

For example, the scene where Tommy tells a story and Henry is responding to him—the "Funny how? Do I amuse you?" scene—is based on an actual event that Pesci experienced. Pesci was working as a waiter when he thought he was making a compliment to a mobster by saying he was "funny"; however, the comment was not taken well. It was worked on in rehearsals where he and Liotta improvised, and Scorsese recorded four to five takes, rewrote their dialogue, and inserted it into the script. The dinner scene with Tommy's mother was largely improvised. Pesci received the Academy Award for Best Supporting Actor for the role, which he accepted with one of the shortest speeches in Oscar history, saying simply, "It's my privilege. Thank you" before leaving the stage.

Pesci also co-starred in the blockbuster Home Alone in 1990, playing Harry Lyme, one of two bumbling burglars (along with good friend Daniel Stern) who attempt to burgle the house of the young character played by Macaulay Culkin. Pesci's use of "cartoon cursing," or menacing gibberish, garnered comparisons to Looney Tunes character Yosemite Sam. Two years later, Pesci reprised his role in the sequel Home Alone 2: Lost in New York.

In 1991, Pesci played David Ferrie in JFK. In 1992, he appeared as the title character in the comedy My Cousin Vinny with Ralph Macchio, Marisa Tomei and Fred Gwynne. During the same year Pesci headed up the cast of The Public Eye as Leon "Bernzy" Bernstein, a photographer. His performance in the film, a departure from his usual characters, has been critically acclaimed.

Pesci hosted the sketch comedy show Saturday Night Live on October 10, 1992, while doing publicity for My Cousin Vinny. During his monologue, he restored a picture of Pope John Paul II that had been torn by Sinéad O'Connor on the previous broadcast.

In 1993, Pesci made an appearance in A Bronx Tale as Carmine. The film starred Robert De Niro, who also directed, and Chazz Palminteri, who wrote the play from which the film was adapted. Both De Niro and Palminteri personally offered Pesci the role. In 1995, Pesci had his third collaboration with Scorsese and De Niro in the film Casino, playing Nicky Santoro, based on real-life Mob enforcer Anthony Spilotro, along with Sharon Stone and James Woods; Pesci had previously co-starred with the latter in Once Upon a Time in America. During filming, Pesci broke the same rib that had been broken 15 years prior during the production of Raging Bull. In 1996, Pesci was considered to play Myron Larabee, the stressed-out postman, in Jingle All the Way opposite Arnold Schwarzenegger, but the part was ultimately given to Sinbad, whose physical size was more comparable to Schwarzenegger's.

He had starring roles in several other films, including Man on Fire (1987), The Super (1991), Jimmy Hollywood (1994), With Honors (also 1994) and Gone Fishin' (1997). Pesci's role in With Honors was a dramatic role in which he played a homeless man living on the campus of Harvard.

Musical career
In 1998, he released his second album and his first in 30 years, Vincent LaGuardia Gambini Sings Just for You which was named after his character from the 1992 film My Cousin Vinny. The album was both humorous and serious, exploring a variety of genres, though most of it was big band jazz. The album spawned the single "Wise Guy", a rap number that played on the gangsta theme by making reference to Mafia gangsterism. "Wise Guy" interpolated the 1980 hit "Rapture" by Blondie, and was co-written and produced by the hip-hop production team the Trackmasters.

Semi-retirement from acting
In 1999, Pesci announced his retirement from acting to pursue a musical career and to enjoy life away from the camera. He returned to acting when he did a cameo in De Niro's 2006 film The Good Shepherd. In 2010, he starred in the brothel drama Love Ranch alongside Helen Mirren.

Pesci appeared with Don Rickles in a 2011 Snickers advertisement in which he portrays the angry alter ego of a young man who attends a party and becomes agitated by two women until he is calmed down by eating a Snickers bar.

In 2011, Pesci sued Fiore Films, the producers of the film Gotti saying they had broken their promise to cast him in the film as real-life mobster Angelo Ruggiero. Pesci stated that he had gained  for the role. He sued them for $3 million, which was the payment he had been promised. The lawsuit was settled out of court in 2013 for an unspecified sum, and the role after many production delays, eventually went to Pruitt Taylor Vince.

Pesci appears in the 2016 music documentary Jimmy Scott: I Go Back Home in which he is filmed recording "The Folks Who Live on the Hill" from Scott's 2017 posthumous album I Go Back Home.

Reprise for The Irishman
In 2017, Pesci was cast alongside Robert De Niro and Al Pacino in The Irishman, a crime film directed by Martin Scorsese. Pesci was offered his role a reported 50 times before agreeing to take part, at first saying he did not want to do "the gangster thing again," while Scorsese tried to persuade him The Irishman would be "different." The film received a limited theatrical release on November 1, 2019, followed by digital streaming on November 27, 2019, by Netflix. Pesci's performance as Russell Bufalino was critically acclaimed and earned him various accolades, including nominations for the Academy Award for Best Supporting Actor, the BAFTA Award for Best Supporting Actor and for two Screen Actors Guild Awards. Pesci also returned to music with his third album and his first in 21 years, titled Pesci... Still Singing, released on November 29, 2019.

Personal life
Pesci has been married and divorced three times. His first marriage was in January 1964. His third marriage was from 1988 to 1992, to Claudia Haro, a model and actress. In 2007, Pesci was engaged to Angie Everhart but the couple broke up in 2008.

Filmography

Film

Television

Awards and nominations

Pesci has received numerous awards nominations including three Academy Award nominations for Best Supporting Actor for his performances in Martin Scorsese's Raging Bull (1980), Goodfellas (1990), and The Irishman (2019).

Discography
 Little Joe Sure Can Sing! (1968) (Brunswick Records)
 Vincent LaGuardia Gambini Sings Just for You (1998) (Columbia Records)
 Pesci... Still Singing (2019) (222 Records/BMG Rights Management)

References

External links

 
 

1943 births
Living people
20th-century American male actors
20th-century American male musicians
20th-century American singers
21st-century American male actors
21st-century American male musicians
21st-century American singers
American male film actors
American male television actors
American people of Italian descent
BAFTA Most Promising Newcomer to Leading Film Roles winners
Belleville High School (New Jersey) alumni
Best Supporting Actor Academy Award winners
Brunswick Records artists
Columbia Records artists
Male actors from Newark, New Jersey
Musicians from Newark, New Jersey
People from Belleville, New Jersey